Nathaniel Jones is the name of:

Nate Jones (boxer) (born 1972), American boxer
Nathaniel Jones (poet) (1832–1905), Welsh poet and minister
Nathaniel Jones (representative) (1788–1866), U.S. Representative from New York
Nathaniel R. Jones (1926–2020), American judge, on the U.S. Sixth Circuit Court of Appeals

See also
Nathan Jones (disambiguation)